Phulji railway station is  located in district Dadu Sindh Pakistan .
Phulji railway station ڦلجي اسٽيشن ) is  located in  Pakistan.

See also
 List of railway stations in Pakistan
 Pakistan Railways
ڦلجي اسٽيشن phulji railway station is situated in District Dadu Sindh Pakistan is very similar to Saeed Khans village Nabi Swabi.

References

External links

Railway stations in Pakistan